Richard William Kazmaier Jr. (November 23, 1930 – August 1, 2013) was an American businessman and naval lieutenant. He played college football at Princeton University from 1949 through 1951 and was the winner of the 1951 Heisman Trophy, Maxwell Award, and the Associated Press Athlete of the Year.

Early life and career
Kazmaier was born November 23, 1930, in Toledo, Ohio, the only child of Richard and Marian Kazmaier.  He graduated from Maumee High School in Ohio in 1948. He played football (four years), basketball (four years), track and field (four years), baseball (four years) and golf (one year) earning a letter each year in each sport. He was recruited by 23 colleges, most offering full scholarships.

A halfback, kicker, and quarterback, Kazmaier ended his career third all-time in Princeton history with over 4,000 yards of offense and 55 touchdowns.

As a senior in 1951, Kazmaier was a consensus All-American and won the Maxwell Award and the Heisman Trophy. He was named Ivy League Football Player of the Decade in 1960 and Time magazine ran his picture on its cover. He was the last Heisman Trophy winner to play for an Ivy League institution. Kazmaier graduated from Princeton in 1952 after completing a senior thesis titled "The Company and the Union: A Case Study". The Chicago Bears selected him in the 1952 NFL Draft, but he declined to play pro football, instead going to Harvard Business School. After spending three years in the U.S. Navy (1955–1957) and attaining the rank of lieutenant, he founded Kazmaier Associated Inc, an investment firm in Concord, Massachusetts.

Later life
Kazmaier served as a director of the American Red Cross, director of the Ladies Professional Golfers Association, trustee of Princeton University, director of the Knight Foundation on Intercollegiate Athletics, chairman of the President's Council on Fitness, Sports, and Nutrition under Presidents Ronald Reagan and George H. W. Bush and president of the National Football Foundation and Hall of Fame. The NCAA gave him its Silver Anniversary Award. He also received the National Football Foundation Distinguished American Award.

In 2007, during a Maumee football game against Perrysburg, Kazmaier was honored by having his jersey number (#42) retired. He also donated his Heisman Trophy to Maumee High School, where it is displayed inside a glass case in the main hallway. The stadium at Maumee High School is named in his honor. His daughter, the late Patty Kazmaier-Sandt, was an All-Ivy member of the Princeton women's ice hockey team who died in 1990 at the age of 28 from a rare blood disease. The Patty Kazmaier Award, which was established by Kazmaier to memorialize his daughter, is given to the top woman college ice hockey player in the United States at the annual Women's Frozen Four NCAA championship.

Personal
Kazmaier died on August 1, 2013, in Boston from heart and lung disease at the age of 82.

Honors
1950–1951: All-American in football
1951: Heisman Trophy winner
1951: Maxwell Award winner
1951: Named outstanding college football player by the Los Angeles Times, the Detroit Times, and the Cleveland Touchdown Club
1951: Associated Press Male Athlete of the Year
1951: Philadelphia Sports Writers Association Athlete of the Year
1960: Ivy League Football Player of the Decade
1962: Voted to the Greater Toledo Athletic Hall of Fame
1969: Sports Illustrateds 1950's All Decade Team
1989: Walter Camp Distinguished American Award recipient
1993: National Football Foundation's Distinguished American Award in 1993
1998: Maumee High School renamed its football stadium in his honor. 
2007: Jersey number (#21) officially retired at Maumee High School in Kazmaier's honor.
2008: Jersey number (#42) officially retired at Princeton University in Kazmaier's (and Bill Bradley's) honor. Bradley had grown up as a fan of Kazmaier and chose the number 42 in his honor.

See also
 List of NCAA major college football yearly passing leaders
 List of NCAA major college football yearly total offense leaders

References

External links
 
 

1930 births
2013 deaths
American business executives
American football halfbacks
American football placekickers
American football quarterbacks
American men's basketball players
American Red Cross personnel
All-American college football players
College Football Hall of Fame inductees
Heisman Trophy winners
Maxwell Award winners
Princeton Tigers football players
Princeton Tigers men's basketball players
Harvard Business School alumni
People from Maumee, Ohio
Sportspeople from Toledo, Ohio
Players of American football from Ohio
Basketball players from Ohio